Luis Torrico (born 14 September 1986) is a Bolivian football defender who plays for Nacional Potosí.

References

1986 births
Living people
Bolivian footballers
Club Bolívar players
Club Real Potosí players
Club San José players
The Strongest players
Nacional Potosí players
Bolivian Primera División players
Association football defenders